The 2011 Richmond Kickers season was the Kickers' nineteenth season in existence and their inaugural campaign in the third-tier USL Pro League. Beforehand, the Kickers played in the USL Second Division. Overall, it was the Kickers' sixth-consecutive season playing in the third division of American soccer.

The Kickers had a successful campaign in USL Pro, having the third best overall record in the league. In the playoffs, the Kickers were eliminated by eventual USL Pro Champions, Orlando City S.C. in the division finals. Outside of USL, the Kickers reached the semifinals of the U.S. Open Cup, their deepest run in the domestic tournament since 1995. During their campaign, the Kickers knocked off two MLS sides, the Columbus Crew in the third round, and Sporting Kansas City in the quarterfinals.

Background

Review

Roster

First team

|}

Standings 
Final standings for the 2011 USL Pro season.

American Division

Match results

USL Pro 

Home team is listed on the left.

Regular Season

Playoffs

U.S. Open Cup

See also
Richmond Kickers
2011 in American soccer
2011 USL Professional Division
2011 U.S. Open Cup

Notes

External links
 Richmond Kickers Official Website

2011
American soccer clubs 2011 season
2011 USL Pro season
2011 in sports in Virginia